Epsilon Aquarii, Latinized from ε Aquarii, is a single star in the equatorial zodiac constellation of Aquarius, located near the western constellation border with Capricornus. It has the proper name Albali , now formally recognized by the IAU. This is a white-hued star that is visible to the naked eye with an apparent visual magnitude of 3.77. The star is drifting closer with a radial velocity of −15 km/s.

This object is an A-type main-sequence star with a stellar classification of A1 V. It is an estimated 388 million years old with a high rate of spin, showing a projected rotational velocity of around 118 km/s. The elemental abundances in the stellar atmosphere are close to solar, with pronounced underabundances of aluminium and strontium. The star has three times the mass of the Sun and about 2.5 times the Sun's radius. It is radiating 138 times the luminosity of the Sun from its photosphere at an effective temperature of 9,622 K.

Nomenclature
ε Aquarii (Latinised to Epsilon Aquarii) is the star's Bayer designation.

It bore the traditional name, Albali, from the Arabic البالع (albāli‘), meaning "the swallower". (See also Albulaan.) Along with Mu Aquarii (Albulaan) and  Nu Aquarii (also Albulaan), they were al Bulaʽ (البلع), meaning "the Swallower". In 2016, the International Astronomical Union organized a Working Group on Star Names (WGSN) to catalogue and standardize proper names for stars. The WGSN approved the name Albali for this star on 12 September 2016, and it is now so included in the List of IAU-approved Star Names.

In the catalogue of stars in the Calendarium of Al Achsasi al Mouakket, it was designated Nir Saad Bula (نير سعد ألبلع nayyir sa'd al bulaʽ), which was translated into Latin as Lucida Fortunæ Dissipantis, meaning "the brightest of luck of the swallower".

References

External links
 Image Epsilon Aquarii

A-type main-sequence stars
Aquarius (constellation)
Aquarii, Epsilon
BD-10 5506
Aquarii, 002
198001
102618
7950
Albali